Pitane may refer to:

 Pitane (Aeolis), an ancient coastal city of Aeolis, currently the site of Çandarlı, İzmir Province, Turkey
 Pitane (Amazon), mythological eponym of Pitane (Aeolis)
 Pitane (Laconia), an ancient settlement near Sparta
 Pitane (moth), a moth genus in Family Erebidae
 Pitane (nymph), daughter of Eurotas

See also 
 
 Pitana (disambiguation)